Lawyer James Tillman  (born May 20, 1966) is a former tight end in the National Football League for the Cleveland Browns and Carolina Panthers. Tillman attended Auburn University.  One of his more notable plays was an end-around reverse to beat rival Alabama in the 1986 Iron Bowl.

1966 births
Living people
Auburn Tigers football players
Cleveland Browns players
Carolina Panthers players
Sportspeople from Mobile, Alabama
Players of American football from Alabama
Ed Block Courage Award recipients